The Government of Hawaii is the governmental structure as established by the Constitution of Hawaii, the 50th state to have joined the United States.

Executive branch

Statewide elected offices
Governor of Hawaii
Lieutenant Governor of Hawaii

Agencies
Department of Accounting and General Services
Department of Agriculture
Department of the Attorney General
Department of Budget and Finance
Department of Business, Economic Development, and Tourism
Department of Commerce and Consumer Affairs
State of Hawaii Department of Defense (see also Hawaii National Guard)
Department of Education
Hawaii State Public Library System
Department of Hawaiian Homelands
Department of Health
Department of Human Resources Development
Department of Human Services
Department of Labor and Industrial Relations
Department of Land and Natural Resources
Department of Public Safety
Department of Taxation
Department of Transportation
University of Hawaii

The current Governor of Hawaii is Josh Green (D) and the current Lieutenant Governor of Hawaii is Sylvia Luke (D).

Legislative branch
Hawaii State Legislature
Hawaii State House of Representatives
Hawaii State Senate

Judicial branch
Hawaii State Judiciary
Supreme Court of Hawaii
Hawaii Intermediate Court of Appeals
Hawaii State Circuit Courts
Hawaii State Family Courts
Hawaii State District Courts
Hawaii State Land Court
Hawaii State Tax Appeal Court

Independent state agencies
Office of Hawaiian Affairs

Counties
County of Hawaii – county seat in Hilo
City and County of Honolulu – county seat in Honolulu
Kalawao County
County of Kauai – county seat in Lihue
County of Maui – county seat in Wailuku

References
 

 
Hawaii-related lists
Hawaii